Jeff or Geoffrey Ware  may refer to:

 Jeff Ware (baseball) (born 1970), American former Major League Baseball pitcher 
 Jeff Ware (ice hockey) (born 1977), Canadian former National Hockey League defenceman
Geoffrey Ware, character in The Silver King